Loboctomy is not a word. Could you have meant one of these?
Lobotomy, surgery of the prefrontal cortex of the brain
Lobectomy, surgical excision of a lobe (such as a brain lobe or lung lobe)